Alistair Fielding (born 3 March 2000) is a British and Scottish track cyclist.

Cycling career
Fielding became a British champion when winning gold in the team sprint event at the 2022 British National Track Championships.

Fielding represented the Great Britain Cycling Team at the elite level for the first time at the UEC European Championships and World Championships in 2021. He has also represented Team Scotland at the 2022 Commonwealth Games.

Major results
2021
      1st team sprint, UEC U23 European Championships
2022
 1st  team sprint, National Track Championships

References

2000 births
Living people
British male cyclists
British track cyclists
English track cyclists
English male cyclists
21st-century British people